Mark Anthony Sertori (born 1 September 1967) is an English former footballer. He played for numerous clubs in the lower divisions of the Football League, initially as a striker before moving to centre-back. He now works as a sports masseur for Manchester City.

Career
Born in Manchester, Lancashire, Sertori played for East Manchester before signing for Stockport County in February 1987. He made four league appearances before signing for Football Conference side Lincoln City in 1987, who he made his debut for in a 4–2 defeat at Barnet on 22 August. He finished the 1987–88 season with 28 league appearances and six goals as Lincoln won the Conference championship.

He moved to York City in September 1999 for a fee of £25,000 with Sertori agreeing a two-year contract. In March 2001, he had three clubs in a week. He departed York for Shrewsbury Town, making a single substitute appearance, before joining Cheltenham Town.

He dropped into non-League football in the summer of 2001, joining Altrincham. In November 2001 he captained a Northern Premier League representative XI against an FA representative XI. In July 2002 he signed for Accrington Stanley before moving on to Hyde United in January 2003. He retired at the end of the season to concentrate on his new career as a sports masseur.

Sports masseur
At the tail-end of his professional career, Sertori enrolled on a Professional Footballers' Association-funded course at Cardiff, where he graduated as a masseur as well as qualifying in reflexology and aromatherapy. In 2003, he joined Bolton Wanderers as Sports Therapist and Masseur. He followed Sam Allardyce to Newcastle United whilst maintaining a private practice in Stockport. He is currently masseur at Manchester City.

England masseur
An Italian speaker, Sertori replaced the long-serving Chelsea masseur Billy McCulloch as a masseur for the England team under Fabio Capello, being one of three masseurs in England's 17-man technical staff for the 2010 FIFA World Cup. His role with England continued and he was part of the England 2016 European Championship backroom staff.

References

External links

1967 births
Living people
Footballers from Manchester
English footballers
English people of Italian descent
Association football defenders
Association football forwards
Association football utility players
Stockport County F.C. players
Lincoln City F.C. players
Wrexham A.F.C. players
Bury F.C. players
Witton Albion F.C. players
Scunthorpe United F.C. players
Halifax Town A.F.C. players
York City F.C. players
Shrewsbury Town F.C. players
Cheltenham Town F.C. players
Altrincham F.C. players
Accrington Stanley F.C. players
Hyde United F.C. players
Bolton Wanderers F.C. non-playing staff
English Football League players
National League (English football) players
Manchester City F.C. non-playing staff